Nick Levoter Weatherspoon (July 20, 1950 – October 17, 2008) was an American professional basketball player.

Career
Weatherspoon, nicknamed "Spoon", scored 1,431 points at Canton McKinley High School, holding the Bulldog scoring record for 37 years until Raymar Morgan broke it during the 2005–06 season. He was an All-American at the University of Illinois before being selected by the Capital Bullets with the 13th pick of the 1973 NBA draft. Named to the 1974 NBA All-Rookie Team, Weatherspoon spent a total of seven seasons in the NBA with the Bullets, the Seattle SuperSonics, the Chicago Bulls, and the San Diego Clippers.

Weatherspoon was elected to the "Illini Men's Basketball All-Century Team" in 2004. He was a member of Alpha Phi Alpha fraternity, and was initiated in the Fraternity through Tau Chapter in 1971.

Honors

Basketball
 1972 - Team MVP
 1972 - Honorable Mention All-Big Ten
 1973 - Team Captain
 1973 - Team MVP
 1973 - 1st Team All-Big Ten
 1973 - Honorable Mention All American
 2004 - Elected to the "Illini Men's Basketball All-Century Team".
 2008 - Honored as one of the thirty-three honored jerseys which hang in the State Farm Center to show regard for being the most decorated basketball players in the University of Illinois' history.

Career statistics

NBA

Regular season

|-
| style="text-align:left;"|
| style="text-align:left;"|Capital
| 65 ||  || 18.7 || .412 ||  || .691 || 6.1 || .6 || .7 || .2 || 7.6
|-
| style="text-align:left;"|
| style="text-align:left;"|Washington
| 82 ||  || 16.4 || .456 ||  || .746 || 4.2 || .6 || .8 || .3 || 7.5
|-
| style="text-align:left;"|
| style="text-align:left;"|Washington
| 64 ||  || 16.9 || .476 ||  || .701 || 4.3 || .9 || .7 || .3 || 8.3
|-
| style="text-align:left;"|
| style="text-align:left;"|Washington
| 11 ||  || 13.8 || .355 ||  || .625 || 2.2 || .2 || .3 || .5 || 5.4
|-
| style="text-align:left;"|
| style="text-align:left;"|Seattle
| 51 ||  || 29.5 || .461 ||  || .632 || 7.9 || 1.0 || 1.0 || .5 || 12.8
|-
| style="text-align:left;"|
| style="text-align:left;"|Chicago
| 41 ||  || 14.9 || .443 ||  || .881 || 3.0 || .8 || .5 || .2 || 5.1
|-
| style="text-align:left;"|
| style="text-align:left;"|San Diego
| 82 ||  || 32.2 || .480 ||  || .739 || 5.5 || 1.6 || 1.0 || .5 || 13.8
|-
| style="text-align:left;"|
| style="text-align:left;"|San Diego
| 57 ||  || 19.7 || .434 ||  || .692 || 3.6 || .9 || .6 || .3 || 6.9
|- class="sortbottom"
| style="text-align:center;" colspan="2"|Career
| 453 ||  || 21.4 || .455 ||  || .713 || 4.9 || .9 || .8 || .3 || 9.0

Playoffs

|-
| style="text-align:left;"|1974
| style="text-align:left;"|Capital
| 7 ||  || 12.4 || .474 ||  || .400 || 3.9 || .0 || .3 || .3 || 2.9
|-
| style="text-align:left;"|1975
| style="text-align:left;"|Washington
| 17 ||  || 23.8 || .515 ||  || .814 || 4.8 || .9 || .8 || .1 || 10.3
|-
| style="text-align:left;"|1976
| style="text-align:left;"|Washington
| 7 ||  || 32.0 || .450 ||  || .560 || 6.0 || 1.4 || .3 || .6 || 12.3
|- class="sortbottom"
| style="text-align:center;" colspan="2"|Career
| 31 ||  || 23.1 || .489 ||  || .699 || 4.8 || .8 || .6 || .3 || 9.1

College

|-
| style="text-align:left;"|1970–71
| style="text-align:left;"|Illinois
| 23 ||  ||  || .452 ||  || .718 || 10.7 ||  ||  ||  || 16.6
|-
| style="text-align:left;"|1971–72
| style="text-align:left;"|Illinois
| 24 || 24 ||  || .419 ||  || .746 || 11.0 ||  ||  ||  || 20.8
|-
| style="text-align:left;"|1972–73
| style="text-align:left;"|Illinois
| 24 || 23 || 36.7 || .457 ||  || .711 || 12.3 ||  ||  ||  || 25.0
|- class="sortbottom"
| style="text-align:center;" colspan="2"|Career
| 71 || 47 || 36.7 || .443 ||  || .725 || 11.4 ||  ||  ||  || 20.9

References

External links

 College stats at Sports-Reference.com

1950 births
2008 deaths
African-American basketball players
American men's basketball players
Basketball players from Mississippi
Capital Bullets draft picks
Capital Bullets players
Chicago Bulls players
Illinois Fighting Illini men's basketball players
Parade High School All-Americans (boys' basketball)
People from Greenwood, Mississippi
San Diego Clippers players
Seattle SuperSonics players
Small forwards
Basketball players from Canton, Ohio
Washington Bullets players
20th-century African-American sportspeople
21st-century African-American people